Empress Guo ( 223 – 8 February 264), personal name unknown, formally known as Empress Mingyuan, was an empress of the state of Cao Wei during the Three Kingdoms period of China. She was married to Cao Rui, the second ruler of Wei; she was his third wife and second empress. The limited information available about her appears to portray her as an intelligent woman who fought hard to prevent her empire from falling into the hands of the Sima clan (Sima Yi and his sons Sima Shi and Sima Zhao) during the reigns of her adopted son Cao Fang and his cousin Cao Mao, but was unable to stem the tide.

Family background and marriage to Cao Rui
The future Empress Guo was from Xiping Commandery (西平郡; roughly present-day Xining, Qinghai). Her family was a powerful clan in the area. But during the reign of Cao Rui's father Cao Pi, at some point before 223, her clan was implicated in a rebellion; she, among others in her family, was confiscated by the Wei government in the aftermath. She became a concubine of Cao Rui after his ascension to the throne, and he greatly favoured her.

In 237, Consort Guo was involved an incident that led to the death of Cao Rui's first empress (and second wife), Empress Mao.  Once, when Cao Rui was attending a feast hosted by Consort Guo, Consort Guo requested that Empress Mao be invited to join as well, but Cao Rui refused and further ordered that no news about the feast was to be given to Empess Mao.  However, the news leaked, and Empress Mao talked about the feast with him anyway. He became exceedingly angry, killed a number of his attendants whom he suspected of leaking the news to Empress Mao, and ordered Empress Mao to commit suicide.

After Empress Mao's death, Consort Guo became the de facto empress, and her family members were given honorific titles (albeit with little power).  She was not created empress, however, until Cao Rui grew ill around the new year of 239. He died a month later, and Empress Guo became empress dowager, but not regent, over his adopted son Cao Fang.

As empress dowager
By Cao Rui's will, his distant cousin Cao Shuang and Sima Yi were regents, but Cao Shuang soon became the dominant figure in the government; while he put on an appearance of respecting Sima Yi, he effectively pushed Sima Yi aside in governing the empire. How Empress Dowager Guo felt about this is not clear, for her political role during Cao Shuang's regency appeared to be minimal – even though Cao Shuang (and later the Simas) all at least formally submitted important matters to her, they decided on those matters without real input from her.

Cao Shuang was largely viewed as an incompetent regent who entrusted many of his associates who were equally lacking in ability. In 244, for example, under the advice of Li Sheng and Deng Yang, Cao Shuang, lacking in military talent, nevertheless carried out an attack against Wei's rival state Shu Han, without carefully planning the logistics, and even though the battles were inconclusive, Cao Shuang was eventually forced to withdraw due to large number of deaths of livestock, and during the withdraw, many soldiers died in battle or of other causes. Cao Shuang also gathered great wealth for him and his associates, and also spent much time on tours, away from the important matters of state, since 247.

In 249, Sima Yi, with support of officials who were tired of Cao Shuang's incompetence, (after issuing an edit in Empress Dowager Guo's name) carried out a coup d'état and deposed Cao Shuang, and later had him and his associates, as well as all their clans, slaughtered, and then took complete control of the government. This shocked the officials who initially supported Sima Yi, but by then it was too late to try to prevent it. After Sima Yi's death in 251, his son Sima Shi succeeded him and kept the government in as much control as his father did. In 254, Sima Shi carried out another purge of officials who resisted him. It was suspected that these officials were plotting with the emperor Cao Fang and perhaps Empress Dowager Guo to try to counteract against the Simas, but a link was never clearly shown. From that point on, any official who dared to be close to the emperor and the empress dowager was doing so at his peril.

Indeed, later in 254, Cao Fang himself would not be spared (although he was spared his life). Some of his associates had suggested to him to, when Sima Shi's brother Sima Zhao was at the palace to visit him, kill Sima Zhao and then seize his troops and attack Sima Shi. Cao Fang could not resolve to do it, but the news still leaked, and Sima Shi deposed Cao Fang. It was during this incident that Empress Dowager Guo would display her wisdom in a last-ditch attempt to preserve some possibility of preventing the Simas from taking complete control over Wei. When Sima Shi notified her that he intended to make Cao Pi's brother Cao Ju (曹據), the Prince of Pengcheng, emperor, she managed to persuade him that such a succession would be improper – that since Cao Ju was the uncle of her husband Cao Rui, such a succession would leave Cao Rui effectively with no heir. Sima Shi was forced to agree with her, and he made, as she suggested, Cao Mao (the Duke of Gaogui District), the son of Cao Rui's younger brother Cao Lin, emperor instead. Cao Mao, although at age 13, was known for his intelligence and Empress Dowager Guo might have believed that he—alone of the princes and dukes, might have had a chance of counteracting the Simas. When Sima Shi asked her for the imperial seal, she again reasoned with him and refused politely, under the reasoning that she had met Cao Mao before and wanted to personally hand him the seal.

In 255, declaring that they had received a secret edict from Empress Dowager Guo, Guanqiu Jian and Wen Qin made a failed attempt to overthrow Sima Shi, by starting a rebellion from Shouchun (壽春; present-day Shou County, Anhui). There was no real evidence that Empress Dowager Guo was actually in communication with them, however.

After Cao Mao became emperor, he gradually established a circle around him—a number of officials who were unquestioned in their support of the Simas, but who might also have something to gain from allegiance to the emperor, including Sima Shi's cousin Sima Wang, Wang Shen (王沈), Pei Xiu and Zhong Hui. By doing this, he was hoping that he could minimise suspicion against him but at the same time gradually win their hearts. In 255, he made a failed attempt to capture power back—when Sima Shi died while at Xuchang, Sima Zhao was at Xuchang as well. Cao Mao issued an edict which, under the rationale that Sima Shi had just defeated Guanqiu Jian and Wen Qin's rebellion and that the southeastern border was still not complete pacified, ordered Sima Zhao to remain at Xuchang and that Sima Shi's assistant Fu Gu (傅嘏) return to the capital Luoyang with the main troops. Under Fu Gu and Zhong Hui's advice, however, Sima Zhao returned to Luoyang anyway against edict, and was able to maintain control of the government. Indeed, from that point on, he would not let Cao Mao or Empress Dowager Guo to be out of his control, and when Zhuge Dan made a failed rebellion in 257, believing that Sima Zhao would soon usurp the throne, Sima Zhao would insist on the emperor and the empress dowager accompanying him on the campaign against Zhuge Dan.

In 260, Cao Mao, not being able to make much headway in his attempt to reduce Sima Zhao's hold on power, tried to start a coup d'état himself with the imperial guards loyal to him, and after initial successes near the palace, was nevertheless killed in battle. Empress Dowager Guo was forced to issue an edict posthumously deposing him. Further this time, Sima Zhao would completely ignore Empress Dowager Guo's wishes in determining Cao Mao's successor, and he made Cao Huan, the Duke of Changdao District, a grandson of Cao Cao, emperor, even though Cao Rui's brothers still had issue. She died in February 264 without being able to make any further impact against the power of the Simas, and Sima Zhao's son Sima Yan eventually usurped the throne in early 266 and established the Jin dynasty. She was buried on 13 April 264.

See also
 Cao Wei family trees#Cao Rui
 Lists of people of the Three Kingdoms

References

 Chen, Shou (3rd century). Records of the Three Kingdoms (Sanguozhi).
 Pei, Songzhi (5th century). Annotations to Records of the Three Kingdoms (Sanguozhi zhu).
 Sima, Guang (1084). Zizhi Tongjian.

264 deaths
Year of birth unknown
People from Qinghai
People from Xining
Cao Wei empresses dowager